Buck the World is the second studio album by American rapper Young Buck. It was released on March 27, 2007, through Cashville Records, G-Unit Records and Interscope Records.

Background
The album's title is a play on the expression, "Fuck the world".

Production was provided by Dr. Dre, Eminem, J.U.S.T.I.C.E. League, Jazze Pha, Lil Jon and Polow da Don, among others. Guest appearances on the album include 50 Cent, Snoop Dogg, Chester Bennington, Young Jeezy, Bun B, T.I., Trick Daddy and Lyfe Jennings, among others.

The album's first single is "I Know You Want Me", featuring vocals and production by Jazze Pha. The album's second single is "Get Buck", produced by Polow da Don. The third single on the album is "U Ain't Goin' Nowhere", produced by Dr. Dre and released on May 18, 2007. The music video for "U Ain't Goin' Nowhere" was directed by Gil Green (director). The music video was unique as it was filmed in Havana Cuba. The filming in Cuba was made possible after Interscope Records and Gil Green received special authorization from The U.S. Department of the Treasury's Office of Foreign Assets Control (OFAC).

The iTunes version of the album replaces the track, "Lose My Mind"/"Funeral Music", with just "Funeral Music", only 3:15 in length.

Reception
The album received positive reviews from critics upon release. It currently holds a 70/100 on Metacritic. XXL magazine said that Young Buck "puts the spotlight back on the Unit and fires a shot that will be heard around the world." Allmusic's David Jeffries stated that "it's the release that makes him more than G-Unit's clean-up man by proving he could survive even if 50 and Shady bankrupted the corporation tomorrow." Henry Adaso of About.com thought that Young Buck's "eagerness to redeem the Unit is sometimes marred by a lack of focus, as he goes from pimp-playa persona to typical tough-guy talk without catching a breath." Rolling Stone'''s Christian Hoard wrote that "Young Buck proves that he's G-Unit's most enjoyable second banana."

The song 'Push Em Back' was featured in the film Drillbit Taylor during the first day of school scene.

Sales and chart performanceBuck the World'' debuted at number three on the Billboard 200 chart with 140,000 copies sold in its first week.

Track listing

 All lyrics by Young Buck, music compositions are listed below.

Leftovers
 "Do It Myself"
 "Dead or Alive"
 "Sellin' Everything" (featuring B.G.)
 "Gone In the Morning" (featuring Trey Songz)

Sample credits
"Buss Yo' Head" - Contains a sample of "My Hero Is a Gun" by Michael Masser
"4 Kings" - Contains a sample of "Havin' Thangs" by Big Mike

Charts

Weekly charts

Year-end charts

References

External links 
 
 
 
 
 

2007 albums
Albums produced by DJ Toomp
Albums produced by Dr. Dre
Albums produced by Eminem
Albums produced by Hi-Tek
Albums produced by J. R. Rotem
Albums produced by Jazze Pha
Albums produced by Polow da Don
Albums produced by Lil Jon
Albums produced by J.U.S.T.I.C.E. League
Albums produced by Tha Bizness
Albums produced by Jake One
G-Unit Records albums
Interscope Records albums
Young Buck albums